Expo station may refer to:
Expo MRT station, in Tampines, Singapore
Expo Station, a maglev rail station in Daejeon, South Korea
Expo Station, the former name of Daejeonjochajang station, South Korea
Yeosu Expo station, a terminus station of Jeolla Line, South Korea